William Strickland (September 14, 1898 – January 31, 1976) was an American football player.  A native of Youngstown, Ohio, he played college football for Western Illinois and Lombard and professional football in the National Football League (NFL) as a guard for the Milwaukee Badgers. He appeared in three NFL games, one as a starter, during the 1923 season.

References

1898 births
1976 deaths
Milwaukee Badgers players
Players of American football from Youngstown, Ohio
Western Illinois Leathernecks football players